Emmett Louis Till (July 25, 1941August 28, 1955) was a 14-year-old African American boy who was abducted, tortured, and lynched in Mississippi in 1955, after being accused of offending a white woman, Carolyn Bryant, in her family's grocery store. The brutality of his murder and the fact that his killers were acquitted drew attention to the long history of violent persecution of African Americans in the United States. Till posthumously became an icon of the civil rights movement.

Till was born and raised in Chicago, Illinois. During summer vacation in August 1955, he was visiting relatives near Money, Mississippi, in the Mississippi Delta region. He spoke to 21-year-old Carolyn Bryant, the white, married proprietor of a small grocery store there. Although what happened at the store is a matter of dispute, Till was accused of flirting with, touching, or whistling at Bryant. Till's interaction with Bryant, perhaps unwittingly, violated the unwritten code of behavior for a black male interacting with a white female in the Jim Crow-era South. Several nights after the incident in the store, Bryant's husband Roy and his half-brother J.W. Milam, who were armed, went to Till's great-uncle's house and abducted Emmett. They took him away then beat and mutilated him before shooting him in the head and sinking his body in the Tallahatchie River. Three days later, the boy's mutilated and bloated body was discovered and retrieved from the river.

Till's body was returned to Chicago, where his mother insisted on a public funeral service with an open casket, which was held at Roberts Temple Church of God in Christ. It was later said that "The open-coffin funeral held by Mamie Till Bradley exposed the world to more than her son Emmett Till's bloated, mutilated body. Her decision focused attention on not only U.S. racism and the barbarism of lynching but also the limitations and vulnerabilities of American democracy". Tens of thousands attended his funeral or viewed his open casket, and images of his mutilated body were published in black-oriented magazines and newspapers, rallying popular black support and white sympathy across the U.S. Intense scrutiny was brought to bear on the lack of black civil rights in Mississippi, with newspapers around the U.S. critical of the state. Although local newspapers and law enforcement officials initially decried the violence against Till and called for justice, they responded to national criticism by defending Mississippians, temporarily giving support to the killers.

In September 1955, an all-white jury found Bryant and Milam not guilty of Till's murder. Protected against double jeopardy, the two men publicly admitted in a 1956 interview with Look magazine that they had tortured and murdered the boy, selling the story of how they did it for $4,000. Till's murder was seen as a catalyst for the next phase of the civil rights movement. In December 1955, the Montgomery bus boycott began in Alabama and lasted more than a year, resulting eventually in a U.S. Supreme Court ruling that segregated buses were unconstitutional. According to historians, events surrounding Till's life and death continue to resonate. 

An Emmett Till Memorial Commission was established in the early 21st century. The Sumner County Courthouse was restored and includes the Emmett Till Interpretive Center. Fifty-one sites in the Mississippi Delta are memorialized as associated with Till. The Emmett Till Antilynching Act, an American law which makes lynching a federal hate crime, was signed into law on March 29, 2022 by President Joe Biden.

Early childhood 
Emmett Till was born in 1941 in Chicago; he was the son of Mamie Carthan (1921–2003) and Louis Till (1922–1945). Emmett's mother Mamie was born in the small Delta town of Webb, Mississippi. The Delta region encompasses the large, multi-county area of northwestern Mississippi in the watershed of the Yazoo and Mississippi rivers. When Carthan was two years old, her family moved to Argo, Illinois, near Chicago, as part of the Great Migration of rural black families out of the South to the North to escape violence, lack of opportunity and unequal treatment under the law. Argo received so many Southern migrants that it was named "Little Mississippi"; Carthan's mother's home was often used by other recent migrants as a way station while they were trying to find jobs and housing.

Mississippi was the poorest state in the U.S. in the 1950s, and the Delta counties were some of the poorest in Mississippi. Mamie Carthan was born in Tallahatchie County, where the average income per white household in 1949 was $690. For black families, the figure was $462. In the rural areas, economic opportunities for blacks were almost nonexistent. They were mostly sharecroppers who lived on land owned by whites. Blacks had essentially been disenfranchised and excluded from voting and the political system since 1890 when the white-dominated legislature passed a new constitution that raised barriers to voter registration. Whites had also passed ordinances establishing racial segregation and Jim Crow laws.

Mamie largely raised Emmett with her mother; she and Louis Till separated in 1942 after she discovered that he had been unfaithful. Louis later assaulted her, choking her to unconsciousness, to which she responded by throwing scalding water at him. For violating court orders to stay away from Mamie, Louis Till was forced by a judge in 1943 to choose between jail or enlisting in the U.S. Army. In 1945, a few weeks before his son's fourth birthday, he was court-martialed and executed in Italy for the murder of an Italian woman and the rape of two others.

At the age of six, Emmett contracted polio, which left him with a persistent stutter. Mamie and Emmett moved to Detroit, where she met and married "Pink" Bradley in 1951. Emmett preferred living in Chicago, so he returned there to live with his grandmother; his mother and stepfather rejoined him later that year. After the marriage dissolved in 1952, "Pink" Bradley returned alone to Detroit.

Mamie Till Bradley and Emmett lived together in a busy neighborhood in Chicago's South Side near distant relatives. She began working as a civilian clerk for the U.S. Air Force for a better salary. She recalled that Emmett was industrious enough to help with chores at home, although he sometimes got distracted. His mother remembered that he did not know his own limitations at times. Following the couple's separation, Bradley visited Mamie and began threatening her. At eleven years old, Emmett, with a butcher knife in hand, told Bradley he would kill him if the man did not leave. Usually, however, Emmett was happy. He and his cousins and friends pulled pranks on each other (Emmett once took advantage of an extended car ride when his friend fell asleep and placed the friend's underwear on his head), and they also spent their free time in pickup baseball games. He was a smart dresser, and was often the center of attention among his peers.

Plans to visit relatives in Mississippi 
In 1955, Mamie Till Bradley's uncle, 64-year-old Mose Wright, visited her and Emmett in Chicago during the summer and told Emmett stories about living in the Mississippi Delta. Emmett wanted to see for himself. Wright planned to accompany Till with a cousin, Wheeler Parker; another cousin, Curtis Jones, would join them soon after. Wright was a sharecropper and part-time minister who was often called "Preacher". Before Emmett departed for the Delta, his mother cautioned him that Chicago and Mississippi were two different worlds, and he should know how to behave in front of whites in the South. He assured her he understood.

Statistics on lynchings began to be collected in 1882. Since that time, more than 500 African Americans have been killed by extrajudicial violence in Mississippi alone, and more than 3,000 across the South. Most of the incidents took place between 1876 and 1930; though far less common by the mid-1950s, these racially motivated murders still occurred. Throughout the South, interracial relationships were prohibited as a means to maintain white supremacy. Even the suggestion of sexual contact between black men and white women could carry severe penalties for black men. A resurgence of the enforcement of such Jim Crow laws was evident following World War II, when African-American veterans started pressing for equal rights in the South.

Racial tensions increased after the United States Supreme Court's 1954 decision in Brown v. Board of Education to end segregation in public education, which it ruled unconstitutional. Many segregationists believed the ruling would lead to interracial dating and marriage. Whites strongly resisted the court's ruling; one Virginia county closed all its public schools to prevent integration. Other jurisdictions simply ignored the ruling. In other ways, whites used stronger measures to keep blacks politically disenfranchised, which they had been since the turn of the century. Segregation in the South was used to constrain blacks forcefully from any semblance of social equality.

A week before Till arrived in Mississippi, a black activist named Lamar Smith was shot and killed in front of the county courthouse in Brookhaven for political organizing. Three white suspects were arrested, but they were soon released.

Encounter between Till and Carolyn Bryant 

Till arrived at the home of Mose and Elizabeth Wright in Money, Mississippi, on August 21, 1955. On the evening of August 24, Till and several young relatives and neighbors were driven by his cousin Maurice Wright to Bryant's Grocery and Meat Market to buy candy. Till's companions were children of sharecroppers and had been picking cotton all day. The market mostly served the local sharecropper population and was owned by a white couple, 24-year-old Roy Bryant and his 21-year-old wife Carolyn. Carolyn was alone in the front of the store that day; her sister-in-law Juanita Milam was in the rear of the store watching children. A number of other local youths were playing or watching a checkers game on a board the Bryants had set up outside the store.

The facts of what took place in the store are still disputed. Journalist William Bradford Huie reported that Till showed the youths outside the store a photograph of a white girl in his wallet, and bragged that she was  his girlfriend. Till's cousin Curtis Jones said the photograph was of an integrated class at the school Till attended in Chicago. According to Huie and Jones, one or more of the local boys then dared Till to speak to Bryant. However, in his 2009 book, Till's cousin Simeon Wright, who was present, disputed the accounts of Huie and Jones. According to Wright, Till did not have a photo of a white girl, and no one dared him to flirt with Bryant. Speaking in 2015, Wright said: "We didn't dare him to go to the store—the white folk said that. They said that he had pictures of his white girlfriend. There were no pictures. They never talked to me. They never interviewed me." The FBI report completed in 2006 notes: "[Curtis] Jones recanted his 1955 statements prior to his death and apologized to Mamie Till-Mobley".

According to Simeon Wright and Wheeler Parker, Till wolf-whistled at Bryant. Wright said  "I think [Emmett] wanted to get a laugh out of us or something," adding, "He was always joking around, and it was hard to tell when he was serious."  Wright stated that following the whistle he became immediately alarmed. "Well, it scared us half to death," Wright recalled. "You know, we were almost in shock. We couldn't get out of there fast enough, because we had never heard of anything like that before. A black boy whistling at a white woman? In Mississippi? No." Wright stated "The Ku Klux Klan and night riders were part of our daily lives". Following his disappearance, a newspaper account stated that Till sometimes whistled to alleviate his stuttering. His speech was sometimes unclear; his mother said he had particular difficulty with pronouncing "b" sounds, and he may have whistled to overcome problems asking for bubble gum. She said that, to help with his articulation, she taught Till how to whistle softly to himself before pronouncing his words.

During the murder trial, Bryant testified that Till grabbed her hand while she was stocking candy and said, "How about a date, baby?"  She said that after she freed herself from his grasp, the young man followed her to the cash register, grabbed her waist and said, "What's the matter baby, can't you take it?" Bryant said she freed herself, and Till said, "You needn't be afraid of me, baby", used "one 'unprintable' word" and said "I've been with white women before." Bryant also alleged that one of Till's companions came into the store, grabbed him by the arm, and ordered him to leave. According to historian Timothy Tyson, Bryant admitted to him in a 2008 interview that her testimony during the trial that Till had made verbal and physical advances was false.  Bryant had testified Till grabbed her waist and uttered obscenities but later told Tyson "that part's not true".  As for the rest of what happened, the 72-year-old stated she could not remember. Bryant is quoted by Tyson as saying "Nothing that boy did could ever justify what happened to him". However, the tape recordings that Tyson made of the interviews with Bryant do not contain Bryant saying this. In addition, Bryant's daughter-in-law, who was present during Tyson's interviews, says that Bryant never said it.

Decades later, Simeon Wright also challenged the account given by Carolyn Bryant at the trial. Wright claims he entered the store "less than a minute" after Till was left inside alone with Bryant, and he saw no inappropriate behavior and heard "no lecherous conversation". Wright said Till "paid for his items and we left the store together". In their 2006 investigation of the cold case, the FBI noted that a second anonymous source, who was confirmed to have been in the store at the same time as Till and his cousin, supported Wright's account.

Author Devery Anderson writes that in an interview with the defense's attorneys, Bryant told a version of the initial encounter that included Till grabbing her hand and asking her for a date, but not Till approaching her and grabbing her waist, mentioning past relationships with white women, or having to be dragged unwillingly out of the store by another boy. Anderson further notes that many remarks prior to Till's kidnapping made by those involved indicate that it was his remarks to Bryant that angered his killers, rather than any alleged physical harassment. For instance, Mose Wright (a witness to the kidnapping) said that the kidnappers mentioned only "talk" at the store, and Sheriff George Smith only spoke of the arrested killers accusing Till of "ugly remarks". Anderson suggests that this evidence taken together implies that the more extreme details of Bryant's story were invented after the fact as part of the defense's legal strategy.

In any event, after Wright and Till left the store, Bryant went outside to retrieve a pistol from underneath the seat of a car. Till and his companions saw her do this and left immediately. It was acknowledged that Till whistled while Bryant was going to her car. However, one witness, Roosevelt Crawford, maintained that Till's whistle was directed not at Bryant, but at the checkers game that was taking place outside the store.

Carolyn's husband Roy Bryant was on an extended trip hauling shrimp to Texas and did not return home until August 27.  Historian Timothy Tyson said an investigation by civil rights activists concluded Carolyn Bryant did not initially tell her husband Roy Bryant about the encounter with Till, and that Roy was told by a person who hung around down at their store. Roy was reportedly angry at his wife for not telling him.  Carolyn Bryant told the FBI she did not tell her husband because she feared he would assault Till.

Lynching 

When Roy Bryant was informed of what had happened, he aggressively questioned several young black men who entered the store. That evening, Bryant, with a black man named J. W. Washington, approached a black teenager walking along a road. Bryant ordered Washington to seize the boy, put him in the back of a pickup truck, and took him to be identified by a companion of Carolyn's who had witnessed the episode with Till. Friends or parents vouched for the boy in Bryant's store, and Carolyn's companion denied that the boy Bryant and Washington seized was the one who had accosted her. Somehow, Bryant learned that the boy in the incident was from Chicago and was staying with Mose Wright. Several witnesses overheard Bryant and his 36-year-old half-brother, John William "J. W." Milam, discussing taking Till from his house.

In the early morning hours of August 28, 1955, sometime between 2 and 3:30a.m., Bryant and Milam drove to Mose Wright's house. Milam was armed with a pistol and a flashlight. He asked Wright if he had three boys in the house from Chicago. Till was sharing a bed with another cousin and there were a total of eight people in the cabin. Milam asked Wright to take them to "the nigger who did the talking". Till's great-aunt offered the men money, but Milam refused as he rushed Emmett to put on his clothes. Mose Wright informed the men that Till was from up north and didn't know any better. Milam reportedly then asked, "How old are you, preacher?" to which Wright responded "64". Milam threatened that if Wright told anybody he wouldn't live to see 65. The men marched Till out to the truck. Wright said he heard them ask someone in the car if this was the boy, and heard someone say "yes". When asked if the voice was that of a man or a woman Wright said "it seemed like it was a lighter voice than a man's". In a 1956 interview with Look magazine, in which they confessed to the killing, Bryant and Milam said they would have brought Till by the store in order to have Carolyn identify him, but stated they did not do so because they said Till admitted to being the one who had talked to her.

They tied up Till in the back of a green pickup truck and drove toward Money, Mississippi. According to some witnesses, they took Till back to Bryant's Groceries and recruited two black men. The men then drove to a barn in Drew. They pistol-whipped him on the way and reportedly knocked him unconscious. Willie Reed, who was 18 years old at the time, saw the truck passing by. Reed recalled seeing two white men in the front seat, and "two black males" in the back. Some have speculated that the two black men worked for Milam and were forced to help with the beating, although they later denied being present.

Willie Reed said that while walking home, he heard the beating and crying from the barn. He told a neighbor and they both walked back up the road to a water well near the barn, where they were approached by Milam. Milam asked if they heard anything. Reed responded "No". Others passed by the shed and heard yelling. A local neighbor also spotted "Too Tight" (Leroy Collins) at the back of the barn washing blood off the truck and noticed Till's boot. Milam explained he had killed a deer and that the boot belonged to him.

Some have claimed that Till was shot and tossed over the Black Bayou Bridge in Glendora, Mississippi, near the Tallahatchie River. The group drove back to Roy Bryant's home in Money, where they reportedly burned Emmett's clothes.

In an interview with William Bradford Huie that was published in Look magazine in 1956, Bryant and Milam said that they intended to beat Till and throw him off an embankment into the river to frighten him. They told Huie that while they were beating Till, he called them bastards, declared he was as good as they and said that he had sexual encounters with white women. They put Till in the back of their truck, and drove to a cotton gin to take a  fan—the only time they admitted to being worried, thinking that by this time in early daylight they would be spotted and accused of stealing—and drove for several miles along the river looking for a place to dispose of Till. They shot him by the river and weighted his body with the fan.

Mose Wright stayed on his front porch for twenty minutes waiting for Till to return. He did not go back to bed. He and another man went into Money, got gasoline, and drove around trying to find Till. Unsuccessful, they returned home by 8:00 am. After hearing from Wright that he would not call the police because he feared for his life, Curtis Jones placed a call to the Leflore County sheriff, and another to his mother in Chicago. Distraught, she called Emmett's mother Mamie Till Bradley. Wright and his wife Elizabeth drove to Sumner, where Elizabeth's brother contacted the sheriff.

Bryant and Milam were questioned by Leflore County sheriff George Smith. They admitted they had taken the boy from his great-uncle's yard, but claimed they had released him the same night in front of Bryant's store. Bryant and Milam were arrested for kidnapping. Word got out that Till was missing, and soon Medgar Evers, Mississippi state field secretary for the National Association for the Advancement of Colored People (NAACP), and Amzie Moore, head of the NAACP's Bolivar County chapter, became involved. They disguised themselves as cotton pickers and went into the cotton fields in search of any information that might help find Till.

Three days after his abduction and murder, Till's swollen and disfigured body was found by two boys who were fishing in the Tallahatchie River. His head was very badly mutilated, he had been shot above the right ear, an eye was dislodged from the socket, there was evidence that he had been beaten on the back and the hips, and his body weighted by a fan blade, which was fastened around his neck with barbed wire. He was nude, but wearing a silver ring with the initials "L. T." and "May 25, 1943" carved in it. His face was unrecognizable due to trauma and having been submerged in water. Mose Wright was called to the river to identify Till. The silver ring that Till was wearing was removed, returned to Wright, and next passed on to the district attorney as evidence.

Funeral and reaction 

Although lynchings and racially motivated murders had occurred throughout the South for decades, the circumstances surrounding Till's murder and the timing acted as a catalyst to attract national attention to the case of a 14-year-old boy who had allegedly been killed for breaching a social caste system. Till's murder aroused feelings about segregation, law enforcement, relations between the North and South, the social status quo in Mississippi, the activities of the NAACP and the White Citizens' Councils, and the Cold War, all of which were played out in a drama staged in newspapers all over the U.S. and abroad.

After Till went missing, a three-paragraph story was printed in the Greenwood Commonwealth and quickly picked up by other Mississippi newspapers. They reported on his death when the body was found. The next day, when a picture of him his mother had taken the previous Christmas showing them smiling together appeared in the Jackson Daily News and Vicksburg Evening Post, editorials and letters to the editor were printed expressing shame at the people who had caused Till's death. One read, "Now is the time for every citizen who loves the state of Mississippi to 'Stand up and be counted' before hoodlum white trash brings us to destruction." The letter said that Negroes were not the downfall of Mississippi society, but whites like those in White Citizens' Councils that condoned violence.

Till's body was clothed, packed in lime, placed into a pine coffin, and prepared for burial. It may have been embalmed while in Mississippi. Mamie Till Bradley demanded that the body be sent to Chicago; she later said that she worked to halt an immediate burial in Mississippi and called several local and state authorities in Illinois and Mississippi to make sure that her son was returned to Chicago. A doctor did not examine Till post-mortem.

Mississippi's governor, Hugh L. White, deplored the murder, asserting that local authorities should pursue a "vigorous prosecution". He sent a telegram to the national offices of the NAACP, promising a full investigation and assuring them "Mississippi does not condone such conduct". Delta residents, both black and white, also distanced themselves from Till's murder, finding the circumstances abhorrent. Local newspaper editorials denounced the murderers without question. Leflore County Deputy Sheriff John Cothran stated, "The white people around here feel pretty mad about the way that poor little boy was treated, and they won't stand for this."

Soon, however, discourse about Till's murder became more complex. Robert B. Patterson, executive secretary of the segregationist White Citizens' Council, used Till's death to claim that racial segregation policies were to provide for blacks' safety and that their efforts were being neutralized by the NAACP. In response, NAACP executive secretary Roy Wilkins characterized the incident as a lynching and said that Mississippi was trying to maintain white supremacy through murder. He said, "there is in the entire state no restraining influence of decency, not in the state capital, among the daily newspapers, the clergy, nor any segment of the so-called better citizens." Mamie Till Bradley told a reporter that she would seek legal aid to help law enforcement find her son's killers and that the State of Mississippi should share the financial responsibility. She was misquoted; it was reported as  "Mississippi is going to pay for this."

The A. A. Rayner Funeral Home in Chicago received Till's body. Upon arrival, Bradley insisted on viewing it to make a positive identification, later stating that the stench from it was noticeable two blocks away. She decided to have an open-casket funeral, saying: "There was just no way I could describe what was in that box. No way. And I just wanted the world to see." Tens of thousands of people lined the street outside the mortuary to view Till's body, and days later thousands more attended his funeral at Roberts Temple Church of God in Christ.

Photographs of his mutilated corpse circulated around the country, notably appearing in Jet magazine and The Chicago Defender, both black publications, generating intense public reaction. According to The Nation and Newsweek, Chicago's black community was "aroused as it has not been over any similar act in recent history". Time later selected one of the Jet photographs showing Mamie Till over the mutilated body of her dead son, as one of the 100 "most influential images of all time": "For almost a century, African Americans were lynched with regularity and impunity. Now, thanks to a mother's determination to expose the barbarousness of the crime, the public could no longer pretend to ignore what they couldn't see."  Till was buried on September 6 in Burr Oak Cemetery in Alsip, Illinois.

News about Emmett Till spread to both coasts. Chicago Mayor Richard J. Daley and Illinois Governor William Stratton also became involved, urging Mississippi Governor White to see that justice was done. The tone in Mississippi newspapers changed dramatically. They falsely reported riots in the funeral home in Chicago. Bryant and Milam appeared in photos smiling and wearing military uniforms, and Carolyn Bryant's beauty and virtue were extolled. Rumors of an invasion of outraged blacks and northern whites were printed throughout the state, and were taken seriously by the Leflore County Sheriff. T. R. M. Howard, a local businessman, surgeon, and civil rights proponent and one of the wealthiest black people in the state, warned of a "second civil war" if "slaughtering of Negroes" was allowed.

Following Roy Wilkins' comments, white opinion began to shift. According to historian Stephen J. Whitfield, a specific brand of xenophobia in the South was particularly strong in Mississippi. Whites were urged to reject the influence of Northern opinion and agitation. This independent attitude was profound enough in Tallahatchie County that it earned the nickname "The Freestate of Tallahatchie", according to a former sheriff, "because people here do what they damn well please", making the county often difficult to govern.

Tallahatchie County Sheriff Clarence Strider, who initially positively identified Till's body and stated that the case against Milam and Bryant was "pretty good", on September 3 announced his doubts that the body pulled from the Tallahatchie River was that of Till. He speculated that the boy was probably still alive. Strider suggested that the recovered body had been planted by the NAACP: a corpse stolen by T. R. M. Howard, who colluded to place Till's ring on it. Strider changed his account after comments were published in the press denigrating the people of Mississippi, later saying: "The last thing I wanted to do was to defend those peckerwoods. But I just had no choice about it."

Bryant and Milam were indicted for murder. The state's prosecuting attorney, Hamilton Caldwell, was not confident that he could get a conviction in a case of white violence against a black male accused of insulting a white woman. A local black paper was surprised at the indictment and praised the decision, as did The New York Times. The high-profile comments published in Northern newspapers and by the NAACP were of concern to the prosecuting attorney, Gerald Chatham; he worried that his office would not be able to secure a guilty verdict, despite the compelling evidence. Having limited funds, Bryant and Milam initially had difficulty finding attorneys to represent them, but five attorneys at a Sumner law firm offered their services pro bono. Their supporters placed collection jars in stores and other public places in the Delta, eventually gathering $10,000 for the defense.

Trial 
The trial was held in the county courthouse in Sumner, the western seat of Tallahatchie County, because Till's body was found in this area. Sumner had one boarding house; the small town was besieged by reporters from all over the country. David Halberstam called the trial "the first great media event of the civil rights movement". A reporter who had covered the trials of Bruno Hauptmann and Machine Gun Kelly remarked that this was the most publicity for any trial he had ever seen. No hotels were open to black visitors. Mamie Till Bradley arrived to testify, and the trial also attracted black congressman Charles Diggs from Michigan. Bradley, Diggs, and several black reporters stayed at T. R. M. Howard's home in Mound Bayou. Located on a large lot and surrounded by Howard's armed guards, it resembled a compound.

The day before the start of the trial, a young black man named Frank Young arrived to tell Howard he knew of two witnesses to the crime. Levi "Too Tight" Collins and Henry Lee Loggins were black employees of Leslie Milam, J. W.'s brother, in whose shed Till was beaten. Collins and Loggins were spotted with J. W. Milam, Bryant, and Till. The prosecution team was unaware of Collins and Loggins. Sheriff Strider, however, booked them into the Charleston, Mississippi, jail to keep them from testifying.

The trial was held in September 1955 and lasted for five days; attendees remembered that the weather was very hot. The courtroom was filled to capacity with 280 spectators; black attendees sat in segregated sections. Press from major national newspapers attended, including black publications; black reporters were required to sit in the segregated black section and away from the white press, farther from the jury. Sheriff Strider welcomed black spectators coming back from lunch with a cheerful, "Hello, Niggers!" Some visitors from the North found the court to be run with surprising informality. Jury members were allowed to drink beer on duty, and many white male spectators wore handguns.

The defense sought to cast doubt on the identity of the body pulled from the river. They said it could not be positively identified, and they questioned whether Till was dead at all. The defense also asserted that although Bryant and Milam had taken Till from his great-uncle's house, they had released him that night. The defense attorneys attempted to prove that Mose Wright—who was addressed as "Uncle Mose" by the prosecution and "Mose" by the defense—could not identify Bryant and Milam as the men who took Till from his cabin. They noted that only Milam's flashlight had been in use that night, and no other lights in the house were turned on. Milam and Bryant had identified themselves to Wright the evening they took Till; Wright said he had only seen Milam clearly. Wright's testimony was considered remarkably courageous. It may have been the first time in the South that a black man had testified to the guilt of a white man in court—and lived.

Journalist James Hicks, who worked for the black news wire service, the National Negro Publishers Association (later renamed the National Newspaper Publishers Association), was present in the courtroom; he was especially impressed that Wright stood to identify Milam, pointing to him and saying "There he is", calling it a historic moment and one filled with "electricity". A writer for the New York Post noted that following his identification, Wright sat "with a lurch which told better than anything else the cost in strength to him of the thing he had done". A reporter who covered the trial for the New Orleans Times-Picayune said it was "the most dramatic thing I saw in my career".

Mamie Till Bradley testified that she had instructed her son to watch his manners in Mississippi and that should a situation ever come to his being asked to get on his knees to ask forgiveness of a white person, he should do it without a thought. The defense questioned her identification of her son in the casket in Chicago and a $400 life insurance policy she had taken out on him.

While the trial progressed, Leflore County Sheriff George Smith, Howard, and several reporters, both black and white, attempted to locate Collins and Loggins. They could not, but found three witnesses who had seen Collins and Loggins with Milam and Bryant on Leslie Milam's property. Two of them testified that they heard someone being beaten, blows, and cries. One testified so quietly the judge ordered him several times to speak louder; he said he heard the victim call out: "Mama, Lord have mercy. Lord have mercy." Sheriff Strider testified for the defense of his theory that Till was alive and that the body retrieved from the river was white. A doctor from Greenwood stated on the stand that the body was too decomposed to identify, and therefore had been in the water too long for it to be Till.

Carolyn Bryant was allowed to testify in court, but because Judge Curtis Swango ruled in favor of the prosecution's objection that her testimony was irrelevant to Till's abduction and murder, the jury was not present. In the event that the defendants were convicted, the defense wanted her testimony on record to aid in a possible appeal.

In the concluding statements, one prosecuting attorney said that what Till did was wrong, but that his action warranted a spanking, not murder. Gerald Chatham passionately called for justice and mocked the sheriff and doctor's statements that alluded to a conspiracy. Mamie Bradley indicated she was very impressed with his summation. The defense stated that the prosecution's theory of the events the night Till was murdered was improbable, and said the jury's "forefathers would turn over in their graves" if they convicted Bryant and Milam. Only three outcomes were possible in Mississippi for capital murder: life imprisonment, the death penalty, or acquittal. On September 23 the all-white, all-male jury (both women and blacks had been banned) acquitted both defendants after a 67-minute deliberation; one juror said, "If we hadn't stopped to drink pop, it wouldn't have taken that long."

In post-trial analyses, the blame for the outcome varied. Mamie Till Bradley was criticized for not crying enough on the stand. The jury was noted to have been picked almost exclusively from the hill country section of Tallahatchie County, which, due to its poorer economic make-up, found whites and blacks competing for land and other agrarian opportunities. Unlike the population living closer to the river (and thus closer to Bryant and Milam in Leflore County), who possessed a noblesse oblige outlook toward blacks, according to historian Stephen Whitaker, those in the eastern part of the county were virulent in their racism. The prosecution was criticized for dismissing any potential juror who knew Milam or Bryant personally, for fear that such a juror would vote to acquit. Afterward, Whitaker noted that this had been a mistake, as those who knew the defendants usually disliked them. One juror voted twice to convict, but on the third discussion, voted with the rest of the jury to acquit. In later interviews, the jurors acknowledged that they knew Bryant and Milam were guilty, but simply did not believe that life imprisonment or the death penalty were fit punishment for whites who had killed a black man. However, two jurors said as late as 2005 that they believed the defense's case. They also said that the prosecution had not proved that Till had died, nor that it was his body that was removed from the river.

In November 1955, a grand jury declined to indict Bryant and Milam for kidnapping, despite their own admissions of having taken Till. Mose Wright and a young man named Willie Reed, who testified to seeing Milam enter the shed from which screams and blows were heard, both testified in front of the grand jury. After the trial, T. R. M. Howard paid the costs of relocating to Chicago for Wright, Reed, and another black witness who testified against Milam and Bryant, in order to protect the three witnesses from reprisals for having testified. Reed, who later changed his name to Willie Louis to avoid being found, continued to live in the Chicago area until his death on July 18, 2013. He avoided publicity and even kept his history secret from his wife until she was told by a relative. Reed began to speak publicly about the case in the PBS documentary The Murder of Emmett Till, aired in 2003.

Media discourse 
Newspapers in major international cities as well as religious and socialist publications reported outrage about the verdict and strong criticism of American society, while Southern newspapers, particularly in Mississippi, wrote that the court system had done its job. Till's story continued to make the news for weeks following the trial, sparking debate in newspapers, among the NAACP and various high-profile segregationists about justice for blacks and the propriety of Jim Crow society.

In October 1955, the Jackson Daily News reported facts about Till's father that had been suppressed by the U.S. military. While serving in Italy, Louis Till was court-martialed for the rape of two women and the killing of a third. He was found guilty and executed by hanging by the Army near Pisa in July 1945. Mamie Till Bradley and her family knew none of this, having been told only that Louis had been killed for "willful misconduct". Mississippi senators James Eastland and John C. Stennis probed Army records and revealed Louis Till's crimes. Although Emmett Till's murder trial was over, news about his father was carried on the front pages of Mississippi newspapers for weeks in October and November 1955. This renewed debate about Emmett Till's actions and Carolyn Bryant's integrity. Stephen Whitfield writes that the lack of attention paid to identifying or finding Till is "strange" compared to the amount of published discourse about his father. According to historians Davis Houck and Matthew Grindy, "Louis Till became a most important rhetorical pawn in the high-stakes game of north versus south, black versus white, NAACP versus White Citizens' Councils".  In 2016, reviewing the facts of the rapes and murder for which Louis Till had been executed, John Edgar Wideman posited that, given the timing of the publicity about Emmett's father, although the defendants had already confessed to taking Emmett from his uncle's house, the post-murder trial grand jury refused to even indict them for kidnapping.
Wideman also suggested that the conviction and punishment of Louis Till may have been racially motivated, referring to his trial as a "kangaroo court-martial".

Protected against double jeopardy, Bryant and Milam struck a deal with Look magazine in 1956 to tell their story to journalist William Bradford Huie for between $3,600 and $4,000. The interview took place in the law firm of the attorneys who had defended Bryant and Milam. Huie did not ask the questions; Bryant and Milam's own attorneys did. Neither attorney had heard their clients' accounts of the murder before. According to Huie, the older Milam was more articulate and sure of himself than the younger Bryant. Milam admitted to shooting Till and neither of them believed they were guilty or that they had done anything wrong.

Reaction to Huie's interview with Bryant and Milam was explosive. Their brazen admission that they had murdered Till caused prominent civil rights leaders to push the federal government harder to investigate the case. Till's murder contributed to congressional passage of the Civil Rights Act of 1957: it authorized the U.S. Department of Justice to intervene in local law enforcement issues when individual civil rights were being compromised. Huie's interview, in which Milam and Bryant said they had acted alone, overshadowed inconsistencies in earlier versions of the stories. As a consequence, details about others who had possibly been involved in Till's abduction and murder, or the subsequent cover-up, were forgotten, according to historians David and Linda Beito.

Later events 
Till's murder increased fears in the local black community that they would be subjected to violence and the law would not protect them.  According to Deloris Melton Gresham, whose father was killed a few months after Till, "At that time, they used to say that 'it's open season on n*****s.' Kill'em and get away with it."

After Bryant and Milam admitted to Huie that they had killed Till, the support base of the two men eroded in Mississippi. Many of their former friends and supporters, including those who had contributed to their defense funds, cut them off. Blacks boycotted their shops, which went bankrupt and closed, and banks refused to grant them loans to plant crops.  After struggling to secure a loan and find someone who would rent to him, Milam managed to secure  and a $4,000 loan to plant cotton, but blacks refused to work for him. He was forced to pay whites higher wages.

Eventually, Milam and Bryant relocated to Texas, but their infamy followed them; they continued to generate animosity from locals. In 1961, while in Texas, when Bryant recognized the license plate of a Tallahatchie County resident, he called out a greeting and identified himself. The resident, upon hearing the name, drove away without speaking to Bryant. After several years, they returned to Mississippi.

Milam found work as a heavy equipment operator, but ill health forced him into retirement. Over the years, Milam was tried for offenses including assault and battery, writing bad checks, and using a stolen credit card. He died of spinal cancer on December 30, 1980, at the age of 61.

Bryant worked as a welder while in Texas, until increasing blindness forced him to give up this employment. At some point, he and Carolyn divorced; he remarried in 1980. He opened a store in Ruleville, Mississippi. He was convicted in 1984 and 1988 of food stamp fraud. In a 1985 interview, he denied killing Till despite having admitted to it in 1956, but said: "if Emmett Till hadn't got out of line, it probably wouldn't have happened to him." Fearing economic boycotts and retaliation, Bryant lived a private life and refused to be photographed or reveal the exact location of his store, explaining: "this new generation is different and I don't want to worry about a bullet some dark night". He died of cancer on September 1, 1994, at the age of 63.

Till's mother married Gene Mobley, became a teacher, and changed her surname to Till-Mobley. She continued to educate people about her son's murder. In 1992, Till-Mobley had the opportunity to listen while Bryant was interviewed about his involvement in Till's murder. With Bryant unaware that Till-Mobley was listening, he asserted that Till had ruined his life, expressed no remorse, and said: "Emmett Till is dead. I don't know why he can't just stay dead."

In 1996, documentary filmmaker Keith Beauchamp, who was greatly moved by Till's open-casket photograph, started background research for a feature film he planned to make about Till's murder. He asserted that as many as 14 people may have been involved, including Carolyn Bryant Donham (who by this point had remarried). Mose Wright heard someone with "a lighter voice" affirm that Till was the one in his front yard immediately before Bryant and Milam drove away with the boy. Beauchamp spent the next nine years producing The Untold Story of Emmett Louis Till, released in 2003.

That same year, PBS aired an installment of American Experience titled The Murder of Emmett Till. In 2005, CBS journalist Ed Bradley aired a 60 Minutes report investigating the Till murder, part of which showed him tracking down Carolyn Bryant at her home in Greenville, Mississippi.

A 1991 book written by Stephen J. Whitfield, another by Christopher Metress in 2002, and Mamie Till-Mobley's memoirs the next year all posed questions as to who was involved in the murder and cover-up. Federal authorities in the 21st century worked to resolve the questions about the identity of the body pulled from the Tallahatchie River.

In 2004, the U.S. Department of Justice (DOJ) announced that it was reopening the case to determine whether anyone other than Milam and Bryant was involved. David T. Beito, a professor at the University of Alabama, states that Till's murder "has this mythic quality like the Kennedy assassination". The DOJ had undertaken to investigate numerous cold cases dating to the civil rights movement, in the hope of finding new evidence in other murders as well.

The body was exhumed, and the Cook County coroner conducted an autopsy in 2005. Using DNA from Till's relatives, dental comparisons to images taken of Till, and anthropological analysis, the exhumed body was positively identified as that of Till. It had extensive cranial damage, a broken left femur, and two broken wrists. Metallic fragments found in the skull were consistent with bullets being fired from a .45 caliber gun.

In February 2007, a Leflore County grand jury, composed primarily of black jurors and empaneled by Joyce Chiles, a black prosecutor, found no credible basis for Beauchamp's claim that 14 people took part in Till's abduction and murder. Beauchamp was angry with the finding. David Beito and Juan Williams, who worked on the reading materials for the Eyes on the Prize documentary, were critical of Beauchamp for trying to revise history and taking attention away from other cold cases. The grand jury failed to find sufficient cause for charges against Carolyn Bryant Donham.  Neither the FBI nor the grand jury found any credible evidence that Henry Lee Loggins, identified by Beauchamp as a suspect who could be charged, had any role in the crime. Other than Loggins, Beauchamp refused to name any of the people he alleged were involved.

Historical markers 

The first highway marker remembering Emmett Till, erected in 2006, was defaced with "KKK", and then completely covered with black paint.

In 2007, eight markers were erected at sites associated with Till's lynching. The marker at the "River Spot" where Till's body was found was torn down in 2008, presumably thrown in the river. A replacement sign received more than 100 bullet holes over the next few years. Another replacement was installed in June 2018, and in July it was vandalized by bullets. Three University of Mississippi students were suspended from their fraternity after posing in front of the bullet-riddled marker, with guns, and uploading the photo to Instagram. As stated by Jerry Mitchell, "It is not clear whether the fraternity students shot the sign or are simply posing before it." In 2019, a fourth sign was erected.

Claim that Carolyn Bryant recanted her testimony 
In 2017, historian and author Timothy Tyson released details of a 2008 interview with Carolyn Bryant, during which, he alleged, she had disclosed that she had fabricated parts of her testimony at the trial. According to Tyson's account of the interview, Bryant retracted her testimony that Till had grabbed her around her waist and uttered obscenities, saying "that part's not true". The jury did not hear Bryant's testimony at the trial as the judge had ruled it inadmissible, but the court spectators heard. The defense wanted Bryant's testimony as evidence for a possible appeal in case of a conviction.  In the 2007 interview, the 72-year-old Bryant said she could not remember the rest of the events that occurred between her and Till in the grocery store. Tyson also reported her as saying: "nothing that boy did could ever justify what happened to him". Tyson said that Roy Bryant had been abusive toward Carolyn, and "it was clear she was frightened of her husband". Tyson believed Bryant embellished her testimony under coercive circumstances. Bryant described Milam as "domineering and brutal and not a kind man".  An editorial in The New York Times said, regarding Bryant's admission that portions of her testimony were false: "This admission is a reminder of how black lives were sacrificed to white lies in places like Mississippi. It also raises anew the question of why no one was brought to justice in the most notorious racially motivated murder of the 20th century, despite an extensive investigation by the F.B.I."

The New York Times quoted Wheeler Parker, a cousin of Till's, who said: "I was hoping that one day she [Bryant] would admit it, so it matters to me that she did, and it gives me some satisfaction. It's important to people understanding how the word of a white person against a black person was law, and a lot of black people lost their lives because of it. It really speaks to history, it shows what black people went through in those days."

However, the 'recanting' claim made by Tyson was not on his tape-recording of the interview. "It is true that that part is not on tape because I was setting up the tape recorder" Tyson said. The support Tyson provided to back up his claim, was a handwritten note that he said had been made at the time.

In a report to Congress in March 2018, the U.S. Department of Justice stated that it was reopening the investigation into Till's death due to new information. In December 2021, the DOJ announced that it had closed its investigation in the case.

Discovery of unserved arrest warrant 
In June 2022, an unserved arrest warrant for Carolyn Bryant (now known as Carolyn Bryant Donham), dated August 29, 1955 and signed by the Leflore County Clerk, was discovered in a courthouse basement by members of the Emmett Till Legacy Foundation. Following the discovery, Till's family called for Donham's arrest. However, the district attorney declined to charge Donham, and said that there was no new evidence to reopen the case.

In August 2022, a grand jury concluded there was insufficient evidence to indict Donham.

In December 2022 Bowling Green, Kentucky, cancelled its annual Christmas parade scheduled for December 3, 2022, due to threats of violence against groups who planned to protest outside Donham's home, an apartment at Shive Lane, Bowling Green. The protests took place peacefully.

Release of Carolyn Bryant Donham memoir 

In 2022, I Am More Than a Wolf Whistle, the 99-page memoir of Carolyn Bryant Donham, was copied and given to NewsOne by an anonymous source. The text had been given to the University of North Carolina to privately hold until 2036. The full text was also posted online and can be viewed as a PDF.

The memoir had been prepared by Donham's daughter-in-law Marsha Bryant, who had shared the material with Timothy Tyson, with the understanding that Tyson would edit the memoir. However, Tyson said there was no such agreement, and placed the memoir at the Southern Historical Collection at the University of North Carolina-Chapel Hill library archives, with access restricted for twenty years or until Donham's death.

Influence on civil rights 

Till's case attracted widespread attention because of the brutality of the lynching, the victim's young age, and the acquittal of the two men who later admitted killing him. It became emblematic of the injustices suffered by blacks in the South. In 1955, The Chicago Defender urged its readers to react to the acquittal by voting in large numbers; this was to counter the disenfranchisement since 1890 of most blacks in Mississippi by the white-dominated legislature; other southern states followed this model, excluding hundreds of thousands of citizens from politics. Myrlie Evers, the widow of Medgar Evers, said in 1985 that Till's case resonated so strongly because it "shook the foundations of Mississippi—both black and white, because ... with the white community ... it had become nationally publicized ... with us as blacks ... it said, even a child was not safe from racism and bigotry and death."

The NAACP asked Mamie Till Bradley to tour the country relating the events of her son's life, death, and the trial of his murderers. It was one of the most successful fundraising campaigns the NAACP had ever conducted. Journalist Louis Lomax acknowledges Till's death to be the start of what he terms the "Negro revolt", and scholar Clenora Hudson-Weems characterizes Till as a "sacrificial lamb" for civil rights. NAACP operative Amzie Moore considers Till the start of the Civil Rights Movement, at the very least, in Mississippi.

The 1987 Emmy award-winning documentary series Eyes on the Prize, begins with the murder of Emmett Till. Accompanying written materials for the series, Eyes on the Prize and Voices of Freedom (for the second time period), exhaustively explore the major figures and events of the Civil Rights Movement. Stephen Whitaker states that, as a result of the attention Till's death and the trial received,

In Montgomery a few months after the murder, Rosa Parks attended a rally for Till, led by Martin Luther King Jr. Soon after, she refused to give up her seat on a segregated bus to a white passenger. The incident sparked a year-long well-organized grassroots boycott of the public bus system. The boycott was designed to force the city to change its segregation policies. Parks later said when she did not get up and move to the rear of the bus, "I thought of Emmett Till and I just couldn't go back."

According to author Clayborne Carson, Till's death and the widespread coverage of the students integrating Little Rock Central High School in 1957 were especially profound for younger blacks: "It was out of this festering discontent and an awareness of earlier isolated protests that the sit-ins of the 1960s were born." After seeing pictures of Till's mutilated body, in Louisville, Kentucky, young Cassius Clay (later famed boxer Muhammad Ali) and a friend took out their frustration by vandalizing a local railyard, causing a locomotive engine to derail.

In 1963, Sunflower County resident and sharecropper Fannie Lou Hamer was jailed and beaten for attempting to register to vote. The next year, she led a massive voter registration drive in the Delta region, and volunteers worked on Freedom Summer throughout the state. Before 1954, 265 black people were registered to vote in three Delta counties, where they were a majority of the population. At this time, blacks made up 41% of the total state population. The summer Emmett Till was killed, the number of registered voters in those three counties dropped to 90. By the end of 1955, fourteen Mississippi counties had no registered black voters. The Mississippi Freedom Summer of 1964 registered 63,000 black voters in a simplified process administered by the project; they formed their own political party because they were closed out of the Democratic Regulars in Mississippi.

Legacy and honors 

 A statue was unveiled in Denver in 1976 (and has since been moved to Pueblo, Colorado) featuring Till with Martin Luther King Jr.
 In 1984, a section of 71st Street in Chicago was named "Emmett Till Road" and in 2005, the 71st street bridge was named in his honor.
 In 1989, Till was included among the forty names of people who had died in the Civil Rights Movement; they are listed as martyrs on the granite sculpture of the Civil Rights Memorial in Montgomery, Alabama.
 A demonstration for Till was held in 2000 in Selma, Alabama, on the 35th anniversary of the march over the Edmund Pettus Bridge. His mother Mamie Till-Mobley attended and later wrote in her memoirs: "I realized that Emmett had achieved the significant impact in death that he had been denied in life. Even so, I had never wanted Emmett to be a martyr. I only wanted him to be a good son. Although I realized all the great things that had been accomplished largely because of the sacrifices made by so many people, I found myself wishing that somehow we could have done it another way."
 In 2005, James McCosh Elementary School in Chicago, where Till had been a student, was renamed the "Emmett Louis Till Math And Science Academy".
 In 2006, the "Emmett Till Memorial Highway" was dedicated between Greenwood and Tutwiler, Mississippi; this was the route his body was taken to the train station, to be returned to his mother for burial in Chicago. It intersects with the H. C. "Clarence" Strider Memorial Highway.
 In 2006, the Emmett Till Memorial Commission was established by the Tallahatchie Board of Supervisors
 In 2007, the Emmett Till Memorial Commission issued a formal apology to Till's family at an event attended by 400 people. It reads:

We the citizens of Tallahatchie County recognize that the Emmett Till case was a terrible miscarriage of justice. We state candidly and with deep regret the failure to effectively pursue justice. We wish to say to the family of Emmett Till that we are profoundly sorry for what was done in this community to your loved one.
 The same year, Georgia congressman John Lewis sponsored a bill to provide a plan for investigating and prosecuting unsolved (cold case) Civil Rights-era murders. The Emmett Till Unsolved Civil Rights Crime Act was signed into law in 2008.
 In 2008, a memorial plaque that was erected in Tallahatchie County, next to the Tallahatchie River at Graball Landing where Till's body was retrieved, was stolen and never recovered. The plaque was a "frequent target for racist vandalism". The location is in a remote area and down a gravel road, meaning that vandals had to go out of the way to get to it. Its replacement was soon also shot up, as was the replacement sign after that. In November 2019, a group of white supremacists was caught making a propaganda video in front of the sign raising new concerns that more vandalism was being planned. The group was carrying a white flag with a black St. Andrews cross, a flag commonly used by a racist Neo-Confederate group called the League of the South. The group quickly scattered when they set off alarms designed to protect the sign.
 The Tallahatchie County Courthouse in Sumner, site of the 1955 trial of Till's killers, was restored and re-opened in 2012. The Emmett Till Interpretive Center opened across the street and is also serving as a community center.
 The Emmett Till Memorial Project is an associated website and smartphone app to commemorate Till's death and his life. It identifies 51 sites in the Mississippi Delta associated with him. On August 29, 2015, the Center held a 60th anniversary event.
In 2015, Florida State University Libraries created the Emmett Till archives.
 In 2020, the National Trust for Historic Preservation named Roberts Temple Church of God in Christ, the site of Till's funeral, as one of America's most endangered historic places.
In 2022, the U.S. Senate voted to award Emmett Till and his mother, Mamie Till-Mobley, the Congressional Gold Medal, forwarding the measure for concurrent action in the U.S. House of Representatives.  The House passed the measure on December 21, 2022.
In March 2022, Congress passed the Emmett Till Antilynching Act.
In October 2022, a bronze statue commemorating Till was unveiled in Greenwood, Mississippi's Rail Spike Park, partially funded by the State of Mississippi.

Casket 

During a renewed investigation of the crime in 2005, the Department of Justice exhumed Till's remains to conduct an autopsy and DNA analysis which confirmed the identification of his body. As required by state reburial law, Till was reinterred in a new casket later that year. In 2009, his original glass-topped casket was found, rusting in a dilapidated storage shed at the cemetery. The casket was discolored and the interior fabric torn. It bore evidence that animals had been living in it, although its glass top was still intact. The Smithsonian's National Museum of African American History and Culture in Washington, D.C. acquired the casket a month later.

Representation in culture 
Langston Hughes dedicated an untitled poem (eventually to be known as "Mississippi—1955") to Till in his October 1, 1955, column in The Chicago Defender. It was reprinted across the country and continued to be republished with various changes from different writers. Author William Faulkner, a prominent white Mississippi native who often focused on racial issues, wrote two essays on Till: one before the trial in which he pleaded for American unity and one after, a piece titled "On Fear" that was published in Harper's in 1956. In it he questioned why the tenets of segregation were based on irrational reasoning.

Till's murder was the focus of a 1957 television episode for the U.S. Steel Hour titled "Noon on Doomsday" written by Rod Serling. He was fascinated by how quickly Mississippi whites supported Bryant and Milam. Although the script was rewritten to avoid mention of Till, and did not say that the murder victim was black, White Citizens' Councils vowed to boycott U.S. Steel. The eventual episode bore little resemblance to the Till case.

Gwendolyn Brooks wrote a poem titled "A Bronzeville Mother Loiters in Mississippi. Meanwhile, A Mississippi Mother Burns Bacon" (1960). The same year Harper Lee published To Kill a Mockingbird, in which a white attorney is committed to defending a black man named Tom Robinson, accused of raping a white woman. Lee, whose novel had a profound effect on civil rights, never commented on why she wrote about Robinson. Literature professor Patrick Chura noted several similarities between Till's case and that of Robinson. Writer James Baldwin loosely based his 1964 drama Blues for Mister Charlie on the Till case. He later divulged that Till's murder had been bothering him for several years.

Anne Moody mentioned the Till case in her autobiography, Coming of Age in Mississippi, in which she states she first learned to hate during the fall of 1955. Audre Lorde's poem "Afterimages" (1981) focuses on the perspective of a black woman thinking of Carolyn Bryant 24 years after the murder and trial. Bebe Moore Campbell's 1992 novel Your Blues Ain't Like Mine centers on the events of Till's death. Toni Morrison mentions Till's death in the novel Song of Solomon (1977) and later wrote the play Dreaming Emmett (1986), which follows Till's life and the aftermath of his death. The play is a feminist look at the roles of men and women in black society, which she was inspired to write while considering "time through the eyes of one person who could come back to life and seek vengeance". Emmylou Harris includes a song called "My Name is Emmett Till" on her 2011 album, Hard Bargain. According to scholar Christopher Metress, Till is often reconfigured in literature as a specter that haunts the white people of Mississippi, causing them to question their involvement in evil, or silence about injustice. The 2002 book Mississippi Trials, 1955 is a fictionalized account of Till's death. The 2015 song by Janelle Monáe, "Hell You Talmbout", invokes the names of African-American people—including Emmett Till—who died as a result of encounters with law enforcement or racial violence. In 2016 artist Dana Schutz painted Open Casket, a work based on photographs of Till in his coffin as well as on an account by Till's mother of seeing him after his death.

Documentaries 
  The Murder and the Movement: The Story of the Murder of Emmett Till (1985) by Rich Samuel and produced by Anna Vasser (originally aired on WMAQ-TV in Chicago)
 The Murder of Emmett Till which aired during Season 15 of the TV series American Experience: website links to program transcript and additional materials for the PBS film
 The Untold Story of Emmett Louis Till (2005) by Keith Beauchamp
 Eyes on the Prize:  Transcript of 2006 PBS documentary

Books, plays, and other works inspired by Till 

This section includes creative works inspired by Till. For non-fiction books on Till, see Bibliography, below.

Songs
 "The Death of Emmett Till", (1955) written by A. C. Bilbrew, recorded by The Ramparts with Scatman Crothers
 "The Ballad of Emmett Till" (1956), recorded by Red River Dave (David McEnery), in the TNT label's True Story Series
 "My Name is Emmett Till", (2013) from Hard Bargain, the twenty-sixth studio album by Emmylou Harris.
 "Too Many Martyrs" (1964) by Phil Ochs, mentions and eulogizes Till
"The Death of Emmett Till" (1962), also known as "The Ballad of Emmett Till", by Bob Dylan
 "Emmett's Ghost" written and recorded by American blues singer Eric Bibb.

Other
 Poem: "Emmett Till" (1991) by James Emanuel
 Wolf Whistle (1993) by Lewis Nordan
 Juvenile fiction: Mississippi Trial, 1955 (2003) by Chris Crowe
 Drama: The State of Mississippi and the Face of Emmett Till (2005) by David Barr
 Poem: "A Wreath for Emmett Till" (2005) by Marilyn Nelson
 The Sacred Place (2007) by Daniel Black
 Musical: The Ballad of Emmett Till (2008) by Ifa Bayeza
 Drama: Anne and Emmett (2009) by Janet Langhart. An imaginary conversation between Till and Anne Frank, both killed as young teenagers because of racial persecution, the play features recorded narration by Morgan Freeman.
 Gathering of Waters (2012) by Bernice L. McFadden
 Painting: Emmett Till: How She Sent Him and How She Got Him Back (2012) by Lisa Whittington, on display at the Mississippi Civil Rights Museum
 Film: Ava DuVernay was commissioned by the Smithsonian's National Museum of African American History and Culture to create a film which debuted at the museum's opening on September 24, 2016. This film, August 28: A Day in the Life of a People (2016), tells of six significant events in African-American history that happened on the same date, August 28. Events depicted include (among others) Till's lynching.
 Film: My Nephew Emmett dramatizes Till's uncle Mose Wright waiting for Till's killers. The film was nominated for the Oscar for best live action short, 2018.
 Ghost Boys (2018) by Jewell Parker Rhodes
 Television series: HBO's science-fiction horror series Lovecraft Country features a version of Till, portrayed by Rhyan Hill, as a recurring character who appears in 2 episodes. The episode "Jig-A-Bobo" recreates Till's funeral in Chicago.
 Television series: Women of the Movement (2022).
 Film: Till  (2022) film based on the life of Emmett's mother Mamie Till-Bradley, as educator and activist after his murder.

Gallery

See also 

 1920 Duluth lynchings
 Louis Allen
 Scottsboro Boys
 George Stinney
 Ossian Sweet
 Isaac Woodard

Notes

References

Bibliography 

 

 

 

 Federal Bureau of Investigation (February 9, 2006). Prosecutive Report of Investigation Concerning (Emmett Till) Part 1 & Part 2 (PDF). Retrieved October 2011.

Further reading 
 Anderson, Devery S. "A Wallet, a White Woman, and a Whistle: Fact and Fiction in Emmett Till's Encounter in Money, Mississippi" (PDF) The Southern Quarterly (July 2008)
 
 
 
 
 
 
 The original 1955 Jet magazine with Emmett Till's murder story pp. 6–9, and Emmett Till's Legacy 50 Years Later" in Jet, 2005.
 NPR pieces on the Emmett Till murder
 Booknotes interview with Christopher Benson on Death of Innocence: The Story of the Hate Crime That Changed America, April 25, 2004.
 Testimony of Carolyn Bryant at trial of Roy Bryant and J. W. Milam

External links 

Emmett Till Archives Florida State University
Documents regarding the Emmett Till Case Dwight D. Eisenhower Presidential Library
Video interview with Mamie Till-Mobley Emmett Till's mother
"Emmett Till Murder", Civil Rights Digital Library.
Treading the Tightrope of Jim Crow: Emmett Till. The Rebellious Life of Mrs. Rosa Parks.
2006 FBI investigation and transcript of 1955 trial (464 pages)
Emmett Till Interpretative Center
Emmett Till Historic Intrepid Center
Mamie Till Mobley Memorial Foundation
Emmett Till Memory Project

1941 births
1955 deaths
1955 murders in the United States
African-American history of Mississippi
Burials in Illinois
Deaths by beating in the United States
Deaths by firearm in Mississippi
History of African-American civil rights
Incidents of violence against boys
Lynching deaths in Mississippi
Male murder victims
Murdered African-American people
Murdered American children
People from Summit, Illinois
People murdered in Mississippi
Racially motivated violence against African Americans
Tallahatchie County, Mississippi
 
Burials at Burr Oak Cemetery
Congressional Gold Medal recipients